The following lists events that have happened in 1826 in the Sublime State of Persia.

Incumbents
 Monarch: Fat′h-Ali Shah Qajar

Events
 Russo-Persian War (1826–28) started.

References

 
Persia
Years of the 19th century in Iran
1820s in Iran
Persia